John Richard Martin Branston (born 20 April 1932) is a former English cricketer active in the mid-1950s. Born at Nuneaton, Worcestershire, Branston was a right-handed batsman who bowled right-arm medium pace, making several appearances in first-class cricket.

Branston made his debut in first-class cricket for the Free Foresters against Oxford University at the University Parks in 1955. Branston was also a student at the University of Oxford, playing four first-class matches for the university in 1956. In five appearances in first-class cricket, he scored 32 runs with a top-score of 19, while with the ball he took 9 wickets with best figures of 3/50.

References

External list
John Branston at ESPNcricinfo
John Branston at CricketArchive

1932 births
Living people
Sportspeople from Nuneaton
Alumni of St Edmund Hall, Oxford
English cricketers
Free Foresters cricketers
Oxford University cricketers